Sol Malkoff (1918-2001) was a calligrapher and designer known for his work with Rand McNally, Gould Typographers, and Typography Shop. He influenced the development of modern calligraphy through his teaching and writing on the subject. Malkoff was born in 1918 in Chicago, where he trained at the School of the Art Institute of Chicago and the Newberry Library Calligraphy Study Group. During the latter part of his career, he published articles and manuals on calligraphy, handwriting, and typography. Malkoff died in 2001.

External links
Sol Malkoff Papers at Newberry Library

Artists from Chicago
1918 births
2001 deaths
School of the Art Institute of Chicago alumni